Dan Burghelea (born July 30, 1943) is a Romanian-American mathematician, academic, and researcher. He is an Emeritus Professor of Mathematics at Ohio State University.

Burghelea has contributed to a number of mathematical domains such as geometric and algebraic topology (including differential topology, algebraic K-theory, cyclic homology), global and geometric analysis (including topology of infinite dimensional manifolds, spectral geometry, dynamical systems), and applied topology (including computational topology).

Early life and education
Burghelea was born in Râmnicu Vâlcea, Romania, in 1943, where he attended Alexandru Lahovari National College (at that time lyceum Nicolae Bălcescu). He attended the University of Bucharest and graduated in mathematics in 1965, with a diploma-thesis in algebraic topology. He obtained his Ph.D. in 1968 from the Institute of Mathematics of the Romanian Academy (IMAR) with a thesis on Hilbert manifolds.

In 1972, Burghelea was awarded the title of Doctor Docent in sciences by the University of Bucharest, making him the youngest recipient of the highest academic degree in Romania.

Career
After a brief military service, Burghelea started his career in 1966 as a junior researcher at IMAR. He was promoted to Researcher in 1968, and to Senior Researcher in 1970. After the dissolution of IMAR, he was employed by the Institute of Nuclear Physics (IFA-Bucharest) and National Institute for Scientific Creation (INCREST) from 1975 until 1977. Burghelea left Romania for the United States in 1977, and in 1979 he joined the Ohio State University as a Professor of Mathematics. He retired in 2015, and remains associated with this university as an Emeritus Professor.

During his career he has been a visiting professor at numerous universities from Europe and the United States, including the University of Paris, the University of Bonn, ETH Zurich, the University of Chicago, and research institutions including the Institute for Advanced Study, Institut des Hautes Études Scientifiques, Max Planck Institute for Mathematics, Mathematical Sciences Research Institute; and invited speaker to many conferences in Europe, North and South America, and Asia and organized/co-organized workshops and conferences in Topology and Applications in Europe and the United States. He has significantly influenced the orientation of the geometry-topology research in Romania.

Research
Burghelea has worked in algebraic, differential, geometrical topology, differential and complex geometry, commutative algebra, global and geometric analysis, and applied topology.

His most significant contributions are on Topology of infinite dimensional manifolds; Homotopy type of the space of homeomorphisms and diffeomorphisms of compact smooth manifolds; Algebraic K-theory and cyclic homology of topological spaces, groups (including simplicial groups) and commutative algebras (including differential graded commutative algebras); Zeta-regularized determinants of elliptic operators and implications to torsion invariants for Riemannian manifolds.

Burghelea has also proposed and studied a computer friendly alternative to Morse–Novikov theory which makes the results of Morse–Novikov theory a powerful tool in topology, applicable outside topology in situations of interest in fields like physics and data analysis. He was the first to generate concepts of semisimple degree of symmetry and BFK-gluing formula.

He has authored several books including Groups of Automorphisms of Manifolds and New Topological Invariants for Real- and Angle-valued Maps: An Alternative to Morse-Novikov Theory.

He has advised several Ph.D. students.

Awards and honors 
1966 – Simion Stoilow Prize, the Romanian Academy
1995 – Doctor Honoris-Causa, West University of Timișoara
2003 – National Order of Faithful Service, Commander rank
2005 – Honorary membership, IMAR, Romania
2009 – Distinction Academic Merit, Romanian Academy of Sciences 
2019 – Medal of Honor, the Romanian Mathematical Society

Personal life 
Dan Burghelea married Ana Burghelea, in 1965. They have a daughter, Gabriela Tomescu.

Bibliography

Selected books
The concordance-homotopy groups of geometric automorphism groups (1971) 
Introducere în topologia diferențială (1973)

New Topological Invariants For Real- And Angle-valued Maps: An Alternative To Morse-Novikov Theory, World Scientific (2017)

Selected articles

References

External links 

Living people
1943 births
People from Râmnicu Vâlcea
Romanian emigrants to the United States
University of Bucharest alumni
Ohio State University faculty
Topologists
20th-century Romanian mathematicians
21st-century Romanian mathematicians
20th-century American mathematicians
21st-century American mathematicians
Recipients of the National Order of Faithful Service
Institute for Advanced Study visiting scholars